Emily Blanche Farnham (born April 14, 1937 in Tisdale, Saskatchewan) is a Canadian curler. Her and her team of Linda Saunders, Pat McBeath and Donna Collins from the Nutana Curling Club in Saskatoon dominated the women's curling scene during the 1973-74 season, capping the year off by winning the 1974 Macdonald Lassies Championship, Canada's national women's curling championship. 

Farnham and Collins had been teammates for seven years before University of Saskatchewan curlers Saunders and McBeath joined the team in 1973. During the 1973-74 season, the team won four major cashpiels in Saskatchewan before winning the provincial championship and representing Saskatchewan at the 1974 Macdonald Lassies Championship. Farham had tried unsuccessfully for 13 years before winning the Saskatchewan provincial championship. At the national championship, her rink went undefeated, winning all nine of their games en route to the national championship. It would be the sixth championship in a row for rinks representing Saskatchewan. In total, Team Farnham won 118 of 120 games over the course of the season, losing just to games - one to a men's team, and one in the Northern Saskatchewan playdowns. 

In 1989, Farnham became the first woman to win the Canadian Senior Curling Championships, after having previously won the national women's championship. Farnham and her rink of Mary Todarchuk, Mary Heidt, Arlie Ellsworth won the Seniors Championship that year for Saskatchewan. At the national championship, the team finished the round robin with a 7-3 record, and then had to win a tiebreaker, before winning two playoff games to claim the championship. Farnham and Heidt were also members of Team Saskatchewan at the 1988 Canadian Senior Championship, where they finished with a 5-5 record. Farnham won another provincial Seniors title in 1991, and lost in the finals of the 1991 national championship.

As of 2015, Farnham lives in Airdrie, Alberta.

The 1973-74 Farmham rink was inducted into the Saskatchewan Sports Hall of Fame in 2000 and the Saskatoon Sports Hall of Fame in 1993. Her 1989 Senior team was inducted into the Saskatoon Sports Hall of Fame in 1993 as well. Farnham was inducted into the Canadian Curling Hall of Fame in 1993.

References

Living people
1937 births
Canadian women curlers
Canadian women's curling champions
Curlers from Alberta
Curlers from Saskatoon
People from Tisdale, Saskatchewan
People from Airdrie, Alberta
20th-century Canadian women